Manushulanta Okkate is a 1976 Indian Telugu-language drama film, produced by Duddu Venkateswara Rao and V. Mahesh under the Aditya Chitra banner and directed by Dasari Narayana Rao. It stars N. T. Rama Rao, Jamuna and Manjula, with music composed by S. Rajeswara Rao. The film was a box office hit.

Plot 
The film narrates a story with a message of universal brotherhood and equality between the rich and poor, Sarvarayudu (Satyanarayana) is the Zamindar. His son Rajendra Babu (First NTR) grows with oppressive mind about the poor people. He is turned out to be good by Radha (Jamuna) when he wanted to spoil her. He joins the poor and fights against the Zamindar for the justice and marries Radha. They had a son Ramu (Second NTR). Zamindar got his son killed. His grandson Ramu teaches him the final lesson.

Cast 
N. T. Rama Rao as Rajendra Babu & Ramu
Jamuna as Radha
Manjula as Shanti
Satyanarayana as  Sarvarayudu
Allu Ramalingaiah as Chalamaiah
Nagesh as Ganapati
Rajasri
Ramaprabha as  Mutyalu & Rama
Kakarala as Sundara Chary
Kommineni Seshagiri Rao
Chalapathi Rao

Soundtrack 
Music composed by S. Rajeswara Rao.

Accolades 
 Nandi Award for Second Best Story Writer – V. Mahesh (1976)

References

External links 
 

1970s Telugu-language films
1976 films
Films directed by Dasari Narayana Rao
Films scored by S. Rajeswara Rao
Films set in the British Raj
Indian drama films